Derbyshire County Cricket Club in 1997 was the cricket season when the English club Derbyshire had been playing for one hundred and twenty-six years. In the County Championship, they won two matches to finish sixteenth in their ninety fourth season in the Championship. They came fourteenth in the AXA Life League and did not progress from the group in the National Westminster Bank Trophy. They reached the semi-final of the Benson & Hedges Cup.

1997 season

Derbyshire played seventeen matches in the County Championship, one against Cambridge University, one against the touring Australians and one against the Pakistan A team. They won five first class matches overall but three wins were in the non-championship games leaving only two wins in the championship. They won four and lost nine matches in the Sunday league.

Dean Jones was in his second season as captain. Kim Barnett was top scorer although Chris Adams scored most runs in the one-day game including five centuries. Devon Malcolm took most wickets.

The team set two partnership records during the season - the second wicket partnership of 417 by Kim Barnett and Tim Tweats against Yorkshire and the third wicket partnership of 316* by Adrian Rollins and Kim Barnett against Leicestershire.

Matches

First Class
{| class="wikitable" width="100%"
! bgcolor="#efefef" colspan=6 | List of matches
|- bgcolor="#efefef"
!No.
!Date
!V
!Result 
!Margin
!Notes
 |- 
|1
|15 Apr 1997 
| Cambridge University  FP Fenner's Ground, Cambridge 
|bgcolor="#00FF00"|Won
| Innings and 12 runs
|  
 |- 
|2
|23 Apr 1997
| Kent  St Lawrence Ground, Canterbury 
|bgcolor="#FFCC00"|Drawn
| 
|  CJ Adams 108; DE Malcolm 6-74; McCague 5-75; PAJ DeFreitas 7-64 
|- 
|3
| 7 May 1997
| Surrey County Ground, Derby  
|bgcolor="#FFCC00"|Drawn
 | 
|  
|- 
|4
|14 May 1997
| Middlesex  Lord's Cricket Ground, St John's Wood 
|bgcolor="#FF0000"|Lost
 | 131 runs
|  DE Malcolm 5-50 and 6-75; PAJ DeFreitas 5-46 
|- 
|5
|21 May 1997
| Nottinghamshire  Trent Bridge, Nottingham 
|bgcolor="#FF0000"|Lost
 | 2 wickets
|  Bowen 7-75 
|- 
|6
|31 May 1997 
| Australians   County Ground, Derby 
|bgcolor="#00FF00"|Won
 | 1 wicket
|  Blewit 121; Bevan 104; Warne 7-103 
|- 
|7
|04 Jun 1997
| Hampshire Queen's Park, Chesterfield  
|bgcolor="#FF0000"|Lost
 | 7 wickets
|  AS Rollins 210; R Smith 154; KJ Barnett 101; Hayden 136; Renshaw 5-110 
|- 
|8
|12 Jun 1997
| Warwickshire Edgbaston, Birmingham 
|bgcolor="#FFCC00"|Drawn
| 
|  VP Clarke 99; DE Malcolm 5-85 
|- 
|9
|18 Jun 1997
| Sussex  County Ground, Derby 
|bgcolor="#FFCC00"|Drawn
 | 
|  Prichard 106; Law 157; Ilott 7-59; Such 5-27 
|- 
|10
|26 Jun 1997
| Essex  Southchurch Park, Southend-on-Sea  
|bgcolor="#FF0000"|Lost
 | Innings and 145 runs
|  
|- 
|11
|05 Jul 1997
| Pakistan A team in England in 1997  County Ground, Derby  
|bgcolor="#00FF00"|Won
| 7 wickets
|  MR May 107 
|- 
|12
|16 Jul 1997
| Gloucestershire  College Ground, Cheltenham 
|bgcolor="#FF0000"|Lost
| Innings and 35 runs
|  Young 237; A Smith 6-47 
|- 
|13
|23 Jul 1997
| Glamorgan  Queen's Park, Chesterfield  
|bgcolor="#FFCC00"|Drawn
| 
|  AS Rollins 148; MR May 116; Dale 142 
|- 
|14
|31 Jul 1997
| Durham Riverside Ground, Chester-le-Street  
|bgcolor="#FF0000"|Lost
| 6 wickets
|  CJ Adams 107; Lewis 160; PAJ DeFreitas 5-37; Brown 5-58 
|- 
|15
|15 Aug 1997
| Lancashire  County Ground, Derby 
|bgcolor="#00FF00"|Won
| Innings and 37 runs
|  Crawley 133; DE Malcolm 6-23 
|- 
|16
|20 Aug 1997
| Leicestershire Grace Road, Leicester 
|bgcolor="#FF0000"|Lost
 | 163 runs
|  Wells 190; AS Rollins 171; KJ Barnett 147; PAJ DeFreitas 5-120; Pierson 6-56 
|- 
|17
|27 Aug 1997
| SomersetCounty Ground, Derby 
|bgcolor="#FFCC00"|Drawn
| 
|  
|- 
|18
|02 Sep 1997
| Northamptonshire  County Ground, Derby 
|bgcolor="#FF0000"|Lost
| 9 wickets
|  Davies 5-46 
|- 
|19
|10 Sep 1997
| Worcestershire County Ground, New Road, Worcester  
|bgcolor="#FF0000"|Lost
| 10 wickets
|  Weston 188; Moody 101 
|- 
|20
|18 Sep 1997
| Yorkshire County Ground, Derby  
|bgcolor="#00FF00"|Won
|9 wickets
|  KJ Barnett 210; TA Tweats 189; PAJ DeFreitas 6-98 
|-

AXA Life League 
{| class="wikitable" width="70%"
! bgcolor="#efefef" colspan=6 | List of matches
|- bgcolor="#efefef"
!No.
!Date
!V
!Result 
!Margin
!Notes
|- 
|1
|27 Apr 1997
| Kent  St Lawrence Ground, Canterbury 
|bgcolor="#FF0000"|Lost
| 6 wickets
|  
|- 
|2
|4 May 1997
| Lancashire  County Ground, Derby 
|bgcolor="#FF0000"|Lost
| 35 runs
|  
|- 
|3
|11 May 1997
| SurreyCounty Ground, Derby 
| Abandoned
|
|  
|- 
|4
|18 May 1997
| Middlesex  Lord's Cricket Ground, St John's Wood 
|bgcolor="#FF0000"|Lost
| 4 wickets
|  
|- 
|5
|25 May 1997
| Nottinghamshire  Trent Bridge, Nottingham 
|bgcolor="#FF0000"|Lost
| 32 runs
|  Johnson 117; Archer 104; CJ Adams 121 
|- 
|6
|08 Jun 1997
| Hampshire Queen's Park, Chesterfield  
|bgcolor="#00FF00"|Won
| 4 wickets
|  
|- 
|7
|15 Jun 1997
| Warwickshire Edgbaston, Birmingham 
|bgcolor="#FF0000"|Lost
| 108 runs
|  
|- 
|8
|22 Jun 1997
| Sussex  County Ground, Derby 
| Abandoned
|
|  
|- 
|9
|29 Jun 1997
 | Essex  Southchurch Park, Southend-on-Sea  
|bgcolor="#FF0000"|Lost
| 1 run
|  
|- 
|10
|13 Jul 1997
| Yorkshire County Ground, Derby  
|bgcolor="#00FF00"|Won
| 114 runs
|  CJ Adams 109 
|- 
|11
|20 Jul 1997
| Gloucestershire  College Ground, Cheltenham 
|bgcolor="#FF0000"|Lost
| 7 wickets
|  KJ Barnett 99 
|- 
|12
|27 Jul 1997
| Glamorgan   Queen's Park, Chesterfield  
|bgcolor="#00FF00"|Won
| 8 wickets
|  DG Cork 6-21 
|- 
|13
|03 Aug 1997
| Durham Riverside Ground, Chester-le-Street  
|bgcolor="#FF0000"|Lost
| 5 wickets
|  
|- 
|14
|24 Aug 1997
| Leicestershire Grace Road, Leicester 
| Abandoned
|
|  
|- 
|15
|31 Aug 1997
| SomersetCounty Ground, Derby 
| Abandoned
|
|  
|- 
|16
|07 Sep 1997
| Northamptonshire  County Ground, Derby 
|bgcolor="#FF0000"|Lost
| 7 wickets
|  
|- 
|17
|14 Sep 1997
| WorcestershireCounty Ground, New Road, Worcester 
|bgcolor="#00FF00"|Won
| 5 wickets
|  Moody 112 
|-
|

National Westminster Bank Trophy 
{| class="wikitable" width="70%"
! bgcolor="#efefef" colspan=6 | List of matches
|- bgcolor="#efefef"
!No.
!Date
!V
!Result 
!Margin
!Notes
 |- 
|1st Round
| 24 Jun 1997
 | Lincolnshire  Lindum Sports Club Ground, Lincoln  
|bgcolor="#00FF00"|Won
| 8 wickets
|  
|- 
|2nd Round
| 09 Jul 1997
| Northamptonshire  County Ground, Derby 
|bgcolor="#00FF00"|Won
| 144 runs
|  CJ Adams101; KJ Barnett 111; DE Malcolm 7-35 
|- 
|Quarter Final
|29 Jul 1997 
| Sussex  County Ground, Derby 
|bgcolor="#FF0000"|Lost
| 5 wickets
|  CJ Adams 129; Rao 158 
|-

Benson and Hedges Cup
 {| class="wikitable" width="60%"
! bgcolor="#efefef" colspan=6 | List of matches
|- bgcolor="#efefef"
!No.
!Date
!V
!Result 
!Margin
!Notes
|-
| Group A 1
| 28 Apr 1997
| Minor Counties cricket team  County Ground, Lakenham  
|bgcolor="#00FF00"|Won
| 6 wickets
|  CJ Adams 138 
|-
| Group A 2
|30 Apr 1997
| Lancashire  Old Trafford, Manchester 
|bgcolor="#00FF00"|Won
| 6 wickets
|  KJ Barnett 112 
|- 
| Group A 3
| 2 May 1997
| Yorkshire County Ground, Derby  
|bgcolor="#FF0000"|Lost
| Faster rate
|  
|- 
| Group A 4
|5 May 1997
| WorcestershireCounty Ground, Derby 
|bgcolor="#00FF00"|Won
| 20 runs
|  
|- 
| Group A 5
|12 May 1997
| Warwickshire  County Ground, Derby 
|bgcolor="#FF0000"|Lost
| 1 wicket
|  
|-

Statistics

Competition batting averages

Competition bowling averages

Wicket Keeping
KM Krikken
County Championship Catches 51, Stumping 2
AXA League Catches 11, Stumping 3
National Westminster Trophy Catches 1, Stumping 0
Benson and Hedges Cup Catches 3, Stumping 0

See also
Derbyshire County Cricket Club seasons
1997 English cricket season

References

1997 in English cricket
Derbyshire County Cricket Club seasons